Simon Liberati (born 12 May 1960) is a French writer and journalist. For his novels, he has received the Prix de Flore (2009), Prix Femina (2011) and Prix Renaudot (2022).

Biography 
Liberati was born in Paris. After studying Latin grammar at the Sorbonne, he became a journalist, among others for FHM, Grazia and 20 Ans where he was responsible (among other things) of the horoscope heading. Subsequently, he devoted himself to writing.

In 2004, Frédéric Beigbeder, then an editor at Flammarion, published his first novel, Anthologie des apparitions, on the theme of adolescence, which enjoyed a positive critical reception.

In 2007 he published the novel Nada exist in which he painted the portrait of a fashion photographer who slides from glitter and celebrity to dereliction.

In 2008, Simon Liberati and Frédéric Beigbeder were arrested by the police and placed in police custody for drug use on the public thoroughfare.

His third work entitled L' Hyper Justine  received the prix de Flore 2009 whose jury was chaired by Frédéric Beigbeder, a friend and editor of the author's first novel. These bonds were noted by some media.

In 2011, éditions Grasset published his fourth novel, Jayne Mansfield 1967, in the series "Ceci n'est pas un fait divers", a narrative in which he retraced the tragic destiny of the actress. The book was rewarded by the prix Femina on 7 November 2011. Jayne Mansfield sold 35,000 copies, a number judged "disappointing" by the publisher itself; A text rewarded by the Feminina sells on average 155,000 copies<ref>Marianne Payot, [http://www.lexpress.fr/culture/livre/pour-vendre-beaucoup-de-livres-ayez-le-goncourt-ou-inventez-l-iphone_1052293.html 'Pour vendre beaucoup de livres, ayez le Goncourt, ou inventez l'iPhone], L'Express, 17 November 2011.</ref> Simon Liberati declared that if his first novel had sold well (around 20,000 copies), others had barely reached the 3,000 mark.

In January 2013 Flammarion published his 113 études de littérature romantique, a book, according to the site evene.fr, "Thick, a little messy, at once naive and sincere, with passages that are forgotten but also moments of grace". and which proposes to the reader to discover the readings that have built Simon Liberati. The book enjoyed a positive reception mainly positive.Marin de Viry, « La guerre du goût », Marianne, 12 January 2013.

On 3 November 2022, his novel Performance was awarded the Prix Renaudot.

Personal life
Simon Liberati has been married to actress and film director Eva Ionesco since 8 December 2013.

 Work 

 Literature 
2004: Anthologie des apparitions, Flammarion
2007: Nada exist, Flammarion
2009: L'Hyper Justine, Flammarion
2011: Jayne Mansfield 1967, Grasset, Prix Fémina
2013: 113 études de littérature romantique, Flammarion
2015: Eva, Stock.
2016: California girls, Grasset
 2017: Les Rameaux noirs, Stock, collection La Bleue
 2017: Les Violettes de l'avenue Foch, Stock, collection La Bleue
 2019: Occident, Grasset
 2020: Les Démons, Stock
 2021: Liberty, Séguier
 2022: Performance, Grasset

 Cinema 
2014: Rosa, short film, in collaboration with Eva Ionesco

 References 

 External links 
 La vir romanesque de Simon Liberati on Mediapart
 Simon Liberati entre sexe, drogue et meurtres hippies on Tribune de Genève''
 Simon Liberati, au sommet de son art on Transfuge
 Simon Liberati on Ina.fr (video)
 
 Simon Liberati, all about Eva, interview and portrait by Olivier Zahm on Purple.fr

1960 births
Living people
20th-century French journalists
21st-century French writers
21st-century French journalists
21st-century French novelists
Collège Stanislas de Paris alumni
French male novelists
Prix Femina winners
Prix Renaudot winners
Writers from Paris